This is a list of participants in A Fazenda (English: The Farm), a Brazilian television show in which celebrity contestants compete against each other to be the last farm resident and win the grand prize. The series first aired in May 2009, and 6 seasons have been filmed as of December 2017. Season 10 premieres September 2018.

A total of 230 participants have competed, and 9 of them have competed in multiple seasons; actress Franciely Freduzeski (season 1), assistant referee Ana Paula Oliveira (season 2) and TV host Monique Evans (season 3), who were the first celebrities to be evicted in their respectives seasons, returned in Season 4 for another chance to win the grand prize. Style Consultant Fábio Arruda, dancer Adriana Bombom (season 2), footballer Dinei (season 4), TV Host Nicole Bahls (season 5), singer Rita Cadillac (season 6) and model Ana Paula Minerato (season 8) returned in Season 9 for a new chance, alongside other ten contestants of Brazilian reality shows.

The youngest contestant was dancer Bia Miranda from season 14, who entered the farm at age 18. The oldest contestant was singer Nahim, from season 9, who entered the farm at age 65.

Some contestants have kinship with other ones: Andressa Oliveira (season 2) is ex-girlfriend of Théo Becker (season 1). Gui Pádua (season 4) is ex-boyfriend of Janaina Jacobina (season 3). From Season 6, Bárbara Evans is daughter of Monique Evans (seasons 3 and 4), Mateus Verdelho is ex-husband of Dani Bolina (season 4) and Márcio Duarte is Vavá's (season 5) twin brother. Mara Maravilha (season 8) is ex-girlfriend of Roy Rosselló (season 7), Aritana Maroni (season 9) is daughter of Oscar Maroni (season 7), Conrado (season 9) is husband of Andréia Sorvetão (season 7), Phellipe Haagensen (season 11) is Jonathan Haagensen's (season 1) younger brother, Mariano (season 12) is ex-boyfriend of Carla Prata (season 8) and Dynho Alves (season 13) is Mirella's (season 12) husband. From season 14, André Marinho is season 11 Drika Marinho's husband, while Bia Miranda is season 5 Gretchen's granddaughter.

In fourteen seasons, the state of São Paulo has the largest number of contestants with 75 contestants. Followed by Rio de Janeiro with 65, Minas Gerais with seventeen, Rio Grande do Sul with ten, Goiás with nine, Paraná and Santa Catarina with eight, Bahia with seven, Distrito Federal with six, Pernambuco with four, Alagoas and Espírito Santo with three, Acre, Ceará, Mato Grosso and Mato Grosso do Sul with two and Amazonas, Maranhão, Pará, Paraíba and Sergipe with only one. The states of Amapá, Piauí, Rio Grande do Norte, Rondônia, Roraima and Tocantins never had representatives until the 14th edition. Only four contestants were born outside of Brazil: From season 4, the boxer Duda Yankovich was born in Jagodina, Yugoslavia (now Serbia), the musician and former Menudo Roy Rosselló, from season 7, was born in Río Piedras, in Puerto Rico, while actress Valentina Francavilla from season 13 was born in Rome, Italy and Shayan Haghbin from season 14 is from Tehran, Iran.

Through telephone, Internet, and SMS text voting, viewers have chosen as winners actor Dado Dolabella, actress Karina Bacchi, model Daniel Bueno, personal trainer Joana Machado, actress Viviane Araújo, model Bárbara Evans, singer DH Silveira, actor Douglas Sampaio, actress Flávia Viana, singer Rafael Ilha, model Lucas Viana, singer Jojo Todynho, digital influencer Rico Melquiades and actress Bárbara Borges.

Contestants
Biographical information according to Record official series site, plus footnoted additions.
(ages stated are at time of contest)

References

External links
Official
 A Fazenda 14
 A Fazenda 13
 A Fazenda 12
 A Fazenda 11
 A Fazenda 10
 A Fazenda 9
 A Fazenda 8
 A Fazenda 7
 A Fazenda 6
 A Fazenda 5
 A Fazenda 4
 A Fazenda 3
 A Fazenda 2
 A Fazenda 1

A Fazenda
Fazenda contestants, A